Zeta Sagittae (ζ Sagittae) is triple star system in the northern constellation of Sagitta. It is visible to the naked eye, having a combined apparent visual magnitude of +5.00.

The primary, component A, has a visual magnitude of 5.64 with a stellar classification of A3 Vnn, where the 'nn' suffix indicates "nebulous" lines due to rotation. This is giving the star an oblate shape with an equatorial bulge that is 14% larger than the polar radius.

Naming

References

External links

A-type main-sequence stars
Sagittae, Zeta
Sagitta (constellation)
Durchmusterung objects
Sagittae, 08
187362
097496
7546